The Galgeninsel is a peninsula on the shore of Lake Constance near Lindau in the Bay of Reutin in Germany.

Geography 
The Galgeninsel peninsula lies 550 metres east of the island of Hoy and about 200 metres south of the loading sidings of Reutin's goods yard, and covers an area of around 1,600 square metres. The territory of the peninsula belongs to the borough of Lindau and Gemarkung of Reutin.

History 
The Galgeninsel was originally the island on which the gallows of the Free Imperial City of Lindau stood. Even today, a hole can be seen in a mighty stone block which once held the heavy gallows post. A 16th-century map still shows the Galgeninsel as an island, but not in the correct geographical location. A view of the town dating to the early 18th century gives no indication of whether it was an island or peninsula at that time, because it only appears at the edge of the picture. An 1836 map still clearly shows the Galgeninsel as an island or several islands. Later maps show the Galgeninsel as a peninsula. By 1856, the remains of a prehistoric settlement were observed in the lake near the Galgeninsel. More recent investigations, as part of the planned expansion of the goods year in 2005, did not yield archaeological finds however. The Galgeninsel and the surrounding Bay of Reutin (Reutiner Bucht) have been designated as a nature reserve.

There is a story of a macabre test which a criminal who was under the death sentence had to undergo. His arms were tied tightly across his back, he was released on Galgeninsel and marched towards Inselstadt, which was a few hundred metres away. The criminal succeeded in making his way through the water, which is deep even at low tide, and reached the mainland. He thus regained his life and freedom.

The last person to be sentenced as a result of the witch trials in Lindau was Maria Madlener. She was executed by sword on 4 August 1730 on the Galgeninsel.

In 2017 the Galgeninsel was the setting of the German TV film, Die Toten vom Bodensee – Der Wiederkehrer.

References

Literature

External links 
 Regierung von Schwaben: Schutzgebiet Reutiner Bucht

Peninsulas of Germany
Former islands of Germany
Geography of Lake Constance
Lindau (district)